Central Securities Depository of Iran (CSDI) is a CSD organization working as the pre-trade and post-trade service company in the Iranian capital market. It is an independent self-regulatory entity, considered as the central registrar of all exchange-traded securities and financial instruments in the Iranian capital market.

CSDI provides clearing and settlement services to all the exchanges in Iran including Tehran Stock Exchange (TSE), Iran Fara Bourse (IFB), Iran Mercantile Exchange (IME), and Iran Energy Exchange (IRENEX).

CSDI has been established in 2005 as a public joint stock company with its main shareholders are the Securities and Exchanges Organization of Iran, Iran's capital market entities, commercial banks, investment institutions, financial groups, brokerage firms, and pension funds

History and background 
With a history of over 50 years and facing a prospect of growth, the Iranian capital market was demutualized in 2005 to see the formation of CSDI as the sole registry entity in the Iranian equity capital market. CSDI's two subsidiary companies, i.e. Capital Market Central Asset Management Company and SAMAT Samaneh have been established in February 2011 and May 2012, respectively.

Services 
CSDI offers the registry, clearing, and settlement services related to the whole range of pre- and post-trade activities conducted in Iran's capital market. CSDI also provides its customers with back-office services, and other solutions including, e-KYC, and risk management programs (credit limit, settlement guarantee fund, etc.), as well as corporate action services, including dividend distribution, rights issue, capital increase as well as value-added services (e-Services to investors, issuers, brokers, government services offices), pledging (providing collateral), legal transfer and post-trade services for commodity exchanges (IRENEX and IME).

CIGS 
CIGS is the infrastructure service platform for identifying all entities entering the Iranian capital market. All market participants and stakeholders, including investors, customers, and legal entities, are supposed to register their information only once and for all on the e-KYC platform, and afterward, they will be able to receive services from all capital market service providers based on verified data they provided to the CIGS platform. Latest figures revealed the number of shareholders registered in CIGS exceeded 40 million people; a unique milestone in the history of the Iranian capital market.

DDN 
The integrated portal for the Iranian capital market stakeholders (DDN) has been developed by CSDI to provide a range of electronic services for the Iranian capital market participants including investors, issuers, and market regulatory bodies, in a unique platform. The platform effectively eliminates in-person referrals of those investors already registered in CIGS. Since 2019, with the advent of the DDN portal, three main services of the Investors’ Electronic Portal (DARA), Issuers’ Electronic Portal (DANA), and Supervisors’ Electronic portal (NAZER) are at reach all market stakeholders in Iran.

DIMA 
The Integrated Portal of Electronic General Meetings (DIMA) is a service platform which provides electronic access to the general meetings (GMs) of the listed companies and those registered with the Securities and Exchange Organization of Iran (SEO) in a secure environment with no geographical limitations. Covid-19 pandemic plays as a boon to hasten the emergence of DIMA. Prior to DIMA all shareholders were required to be physically present at the GMs. DIMA was launched in 2020.

SETAREH 
The first phase of the Electronic Securities Collateralization System, named Setareh, was unveiled on July 27, 2022. The advent of Setareh enabled commercial banks to speed up the process of paying loans to owners of securities by using the online service platform.

International membership 
CSDI is a member of World Forum of CSDs (WFC), Asia-Pacific CSD Group (ACG), Federation of Euro-Asian Stock Exchanges (FEAS), OIC Member States' Stock Exchanges Forum (OICEF) and,  the Asia fund Standardization Forum (AFSF).

References 

Central securities depositories
Organisations based in Iran